Peraiyur is a panchayat town in Madurai district in the Indian state of Tamil Nadu. It is one of the Revenue blocks of Madurai District. Peraiyur is the headquarters of the peraiyur taluk.

Location

Peraiyur town lies 42 km south west of Madurai City and 28 km South East of Virudhunagar. It is well connected by road network.

Peraiyur comes under the Usilampatti Educational District.

Geography
It has an average elevation of 150 metres (492 feet).

Demographics
 India census, Peraiyur had a population of 8880. Males constitute 51% of the population and females 49%. Peraiyur has an average literacy rate of 66%, higher than the national average of 59.5%: male literacy is 73%, and female literacy is 59%. In Peraiyur, 11% of the population is under 6 years of age.

Politics
It is part of the Madurai (Lok Sabha constituency). S. Venkatesan also known as  Su. Venkatesan from CPI(M) is the Member of Parliament, Lok Sabha, after his election in the 2019 Indian general election.

References

Cities and towns in Madurai district